Cindy Kristin Haug (26 August 1956 – 23 August 2018) was a Norwegian experimental writer and children's writer. She was born in Hamar  and was educated at  Oslo National Academy of the Arts (Statens kunst- og håndverksskole).  

She wrote in many different genres and experimented through writing with a  mix  of styles. She made her literary debut in 1982.

She was awarded Mads Wiel Nygaards Endowment in 1993. 
She died during 2018 and was interred in Hamar Cathedral.

Selected works
Se deg ikke tilbake mot Europa og bli stein...O Eurydike (1982)
Faen heller flirer fagert (1983) 
Her der – helt nær (1983; children's book)
Mitt liv, fiksjoner (1984)  
Sort, sofistikert (1986; jointly with Fin Serck-Hansen)
Gaupehjerte (1993) 
Tiende bok (1994)
Fjærtegn (1997)

References

1956 births
2018 deaths
Norwegian children's writers
Norwegian women children's writers
20th-century Norwegian women writers
21st-century Norwegian women writers
People from Hamar